Sergei Amoralov (real name   Sergei Aleksandrovich Surovenko (born January 11, 1979, Leningrad) is a Russian singer and songwriter, known as the frontman of the boy band Reckless Scammers.  Winner of Song of the Year and Golden Gramophone Award.

References

External links

Official site
Sergey Amoralov on KinoPoisk

Сергей Аморалов: «Милиционеры стояли с наручниками и ждали, когда мы отыграем»

1979 births
Living people
Singers from Saint Petersburg
Russian pop musicians
Russian pop singers
20th-century Russian male singers
20th-century Russian singers
21st-century Russian male singers
21st-century Russian singers
Winners of the Golden Gramophone Award